The Headless Pyramid, otherwise identified as Lepsius XXIX, is the remain of a pyramid complex built in Saqqara. The identity of the pyramid owner is unclear, though it is suspected to belong to either pharaoh Menkauhor of the Fifth Dynasty or pharaoh Merikare of the Tenth Dynasty, both of whom are known to have built a pyramid. If associated with Menkauhor, the pyramid's name is Nṯr-ỉswt Mn-kꜣw-ḥr meaning 'Divine are the places of Menkauhor'; if associated with Merikare, the pyramid's name is Wꜣḏ-swt Mry-kꜣ-rꜥ meaning 'Fresh are the places of Merikare'. Other candidates for the pyramid owner that have been proposed are Amenemhat I of the Twelfth Dynasty and an ephemeral pharaoh Ity of the Eighth Dynasty.

The pyramid complex is in very poor condition. Only the main pyramid, its substructure, and the mortuary temple can be definitively identified. Trace elements of a cult pyramid and a causeway exist, however, there is no sign of an extant valley temple. Its substructure was thoroughly investigated between 2005 and 2008 by a team of archaeologists led by Zahi Hawass. Their findings included lowered portcullis gates indicating a burial had taken place, a sarcophagus lid built of schist, and holes cut into the burial chamber floor presumed to have held canopic jars.

Location and excavation 

Karl Richard Lepsius visited the site in 1843, providing brief description and cataloguing it as 'Steinpyramide XXIX' in his pyramid list. Gaston Maspero entered the underground chambers in 1881, searching the ruins for evidence of pyramid texts. Alessandro Barsanti was active in Saqqara in 1900, clearing a section of the pyramid. A brief and unsystematic excavation of the ruins was conducted in 1930 by Cecil M. Firth. The most systematic investigation of the site was conducted between 2005 and 2008 by a team led by Zahi Hawass.

Mortuary complex

Layout 
Old Kingdom mortuary complexes typically consist of five main components: (1) a valley temple; (2) a causeway; (3) a mortuary temple; (4) a cult pyramid; and (5) the main pyramid. The 'Headless Pyramid' has an identifiable main pyramid with substructure and a mortuary temple. There are scant remains of a presumed cult pyramid and causeway, but no trace of a valley temple. The complex is overall in very poor condition.

Main pyramid 
Virtually nothing remains of the superstructure, hence its local Arabic name of 'Headless Pyramid'. This pyramid was enclosed by an enclosure wall constructed from mudbrick.

Substructure 
The entrance to the substructure lies in the approximate middle of the pyramid's north face. The remains of the passage are limited, though it appears to have had a downward slope of 30° and a fine white limestone paving. Beyond the hall is a granite-lined passage sealed by two pink granite portcullises. The sealing of the passage indicates that a burial had been conducted. A second corridor  in length then leads to the ante- and burial- chambers. Inside the burial chamber, the intact lid of a sarcophagus made of grey schist was uncovered.

Mortuary temple and cult pyramid 
The adjoining mortuary temple of the pyramid is known by its local Arabic name as 'Joseph's prison'. To the south, bounded by the enclosure wall, were the remains of another smaller building presumed to be the cult pyramid.

Causeway, and valley temple 
There are trace remains of a causeway leading towards the fertile ground east of the pyramid, though no trace of a valley temple was uncovered.

Ownership 
The date of construction and the identity of the owner of the Headless Pyramid remain indeterminate, though scholars have suggested and presented evidence to support conclusions favouring various pharaohs and dates spanning the Old Kingdom, the First Intermediate Period, and the Middle Kingdom. An absolute attribution remains impossible due to the lack of textual evidence. Consequently, the ascriptions of Egyptologists to a pharaoh are provisional.

Menkauhor 
Jean-Philippe Lauer and Jean Leclant, whilst working on the nearby pyramid of Teti, conjectured that the Headless Pyramid might have been built by Menkauhor. They based their assessment on the manner in which Teti's causeway was displaced south and on the masonry used in the pyramid. Vito Maragioglio and Celeste Rinaldi affirmed the hypothesis further after finding the substructure access corridor offset east of the north–south axis – a distinct feature of pyramid substructures between Neferirkare Kakai's and Djedkare Isesi's reigns – and on failing to uncover any pyramid texts. Jocelyn Berladini assessed the textual evidence available in the late 1970s drawing the same conclusion. However, Rainier Stadelmann, notes that a decree from Dahshur mentions Menkauhor's pyramid in a manner indicating that it is found in Dahshur, leading him to propose that 'Steinpyramide L', found north-east of Sneferu's Red Pyramid belonged to Menkauhor. Stadelmann further suggests that the presence of a Third Dynasty mastaba breaching the wall of the Headless Pyramid indicates that the construction predates it. Ludwig Borchardt also identified the structure in Dahshur as belonging to Menkauhor, though this attribution is strongly contested.

A systematic excavation of the substructure was conducted between 2005 and 2008 led by Zahi Hawass which corroborates the assignment to the Fifth Dynasty. Although no inscriptions bearing the name of a pharaoh were found, Hawass attributed it to Menkauhor as he is the only pharaoh of the Fifth Dynasty whose pyramid has remained unidentified. Hawass cites the lack of pyramid texts to indicate a dating prior to the end of the Fifth Dynasty or to the Middle Kingdom, the architectural style of the complex to dating to around Djedkare-Isesi, the style of the portcullis stones to pre-dating Djedkare-Isesi, the extensive use of quality materials indicative of the economic abundance of the Fifth Dynasty, and the presence of tombs connected to Menkauhor's mortuary cult as evidence for ascribing the pyramid to Menkauhor.

Ity 
Firth's excavations retrieved slight material that led him to ascribe the pyramid to an ephemeral pharaoh Ity, attributed to the Eighth Dynasty. Firth, however, believed that Ity was contemporaneous to Teti, of the Sixth Dynasty, being either a preceding or succeeding king. One hypothesis conjectures that Ity and Userkare are the same pharaoh, who reigned for a brief two years following Teti. He also identified the pyramid's name as Bau Ity meaning 'the Ba souls of Ity' from an inscription found at Wadi Hammamat.

Merikare 
In 1994,  proposed that the Headless Pyramid was the long-sought pyramid of Merikare, belonging to Merikare of the Tenth Dynasty. Málek identified a block near the site containing a partial name of Merikare, alongside the presence of two tombs of officials associated with Merikare near the pyramid, as evidence for the hypothesis. It is known that the pyramid is sited near to Teti's in northern Saqqara and thus the Headless Pyramid is an ideal candidate, particularly considering that no other pyramids of the Fifth Dynasty are in its immediate vicinity. Ahmed Fakhry, citing Firth's discoveries of false doors and coffins belonging to cult priests of Merikare, has also suggested the Headless Pyramid as being Merikare's. There are no other candidate pyramids for Merikare.

Amenemhat I 
Dieter Arnold, after considering Amenemhat I's re-use of Old Kingdom pyramid blocks in his monument in El-Lisht, noted that one specific block dating to the period originates from neither 'Steinpyramide XXIX' nor 'Steinpyramide L', and proposed that Menkauhor's pyramid – the presumed origin point for the block – is as yet undiscovered, lying somewhere in South Saqqara. David Silverman proposes that the pyramid might belong instead to Amenemhat I based on texts from the tombs of Ihy and Hetep and on the siting of the pyramid in relation to the others in the area. Josef Wegner adds that the presence of the mortuary cult for Teti during the Middle Kingdom might be another indicator for a dating to the reign of Amenemhat I.

See also 
 List of Egyptian pyramids

Notes

References

Sources

External links 
 BBC News: Missing pyramid found, June 5, 2008
 Associated Press: Missing Pyramid Found in Egypt, June 5, 2008

Pyramids of the Fifth Dynasty of Egypt
1843 archaeological discoveries
Saqqara